Walter Nicol (20 April 1769 – 5 March 1811) was a Scottish garden and hothouse designer, who wrote several books on practical horticulture.

Nicol was born in Niddrie.  He was employed at a number of estates in Scotland and improved the design and layout of gardens and glasshouses. Nicol is in particular responsible for the walled garden layout at Dalhousie Castle in Midlothian.

Publications
Walter Nicol: The Scotch Forcing and Kitchen Gardener, 1797
Walter Nicol: The Practical Planter, 1799
Walter Nicol: The Villa Garden Directory, 1809 
Walter Nicol: The Gardener’s Kalender, 1810 (2nd edition in 1812)
Walter Nicol and Edward Sang, The planter's kalendar, 1812, Edinburgh link1 link2
Walter Nicol and Edward Sang, The planter's kalendar, 1820

References

External links
C. Byrom: Walter Nicol (1769-1811): A Life Revealed, RCHS Journal, 2000 
Jonathan Cass: Biographical notice of Nicol, http://www.parksandgardens.org/places-and-people/person/997

Scottish horticulturists
1769 births
1811 deaths